Witold Wojtkiewicz (29 December 1879, Warsaw – 14 June 1909, Warsaw) was a Polish painter, illustrator and printmaker. Although generally considered an Expressionist, some of his works are precursors of Surrealism.

Biography
He came from a family of eleven children. His father was the chief cashier at Bank Handlowy and did not support Witold's desire to become an artist. Nevertheless, he was able to enroll at the Warsaw school of drawing, where he studied with Jan Kauzik. After a brief attempt to study at the Imperial Academy of Arts, he continued at the Kraków Academy of Fine Arts from 1903 to 1904 with Leon Wyczółkowski; supporting himself by doing illustrations for the short-lived satirical magazine, Liberum Veto.  

In 1905, he was a witness to the Warsaw Uprising, and made some sketches of the event that were widely circulated. Later that year, he became part of the "Grupa Pięciu" (Group of Five), with Leopold Gottlieb, Wlastimil Hofman,  and Jan Rembowski. Three years later, he joined the Society of Polish Artists "Sztuka" and began to exhibit widely throughout Poland and Austria.

He also collaborated with members of the Zielony Balonik cabaret to create watercolors that may still be seen at the Jama Michalika café, and created illustrations for works by his friend, the writer , as well as numerous vignettes and illuminated letters for books and postcards.

By this time his style had darkened due to the suffering from an incurable, congenital heart defect, which led to his death at the age of twenty-nine. At his mother's request, his diary was placed in the coffin with his remains. A major retrospective was held in 1976 at the National Museum, Krakow.

Selected paintings

References

Further reading 
 Jerzy Ficowski, W sierocińcu świata: Rzecz o Witoldzie Wojtkiewiczu, Ryton, 1993 
 Barbara Niedoba, Witold Wojtkiewicz: między ironią a melancholią : katalog wystawy, Muzeum Śląskie, 1999 
 Zofia Gołubiew, Barbara Domańska, Anna Zeńczak (eds.), Witold Wojtkiewicz, Katalog wystawy (2 Vols.), National Museum, Kraków, 1989.
 Wiesław Juszczak (ed.), Wojtkiewicz i nowa sztuka, Instytut Sztuki (Polska Akademia Nauk), Państwowy Instytut Wydawniczy, 1965

External links 

Arcadja Auctions: More works by Wojtkiewicz.
"Recovery of a Painting by Wojtkiewicz, Lost During the War" @ Nowy Dziennik

1879 births
1909 deaths
19th-century Polish painters
19th-century Polish male artists
20th-century Polish painters
20th-century Polish male artists
Artists from Warsaw
Postcard artists
Polish illustrators
Polish male painters